That Gal of Burke's is a lost 1916 silent short film directed by Frank Borzage and starring Ann Little. It was released by the Mutual Film Company.

Cast
Ann Little - Tommie Burke (*as Anna Little)
Jack Richardson - Arnold Blake
Frank Borzage - Charles Percival
Dick La Reno - Mr. Burke
Gordona Bennet - Mr. Burke's Sister (as Gordona Bennett)
Queenie Rosson - Mabel, Mr. Burke's Niece

References

External links
That Gal of Burke's at IMDb.com

1916 films
American silent short films
Films directed by Frank Borzage
1910s American films